The London Sevens (also known as England Sevens) was a rugby union sevens tournament, the seventh of eight Cup tournaments in the 2009–10 IRB Sevens World Series. The 2010 competition was held at Twickenham Stadium between 22 May and 23 May.  Australia won the tournament with a 19–14 victory over South Africa in the final.  South Africa had beaten Samoa in the semifinals, ending a three-tournament winning streak for the Samoans. New Zealand captured the Plate, Canada won the Bowl, and Kenya won the Shield.

Format
The tournament, as in all 16-team IRB Sevens events, consisted of four round-robin pools of four teams. All sixteen teams progressed to the knockout stage. The top two teams from each group progressed to quarter-finals in the main competition, with the winners of those quarter-finals competing in cup semi-finals and the losers competing in plate semi-finals. The bottom two teams from each group progressed to quarter-finals in the consolation competition, with the winners of those quarter-finals competing in bowl semi-finals and the losers competing in shield semi-finals.

Teams

Pool stages

Pool A
{| class="wikitable" style="text-align: center;"
|-
!width="200"|Team
!width="40"|Pld
!width="40"|W
!width="40"|D
!width="40"|L
!width="40"|PF
!width="40"|PA
!width="40"|+/-
!width="40"|Pts
|- 
|align=left| 
|3||2||0||1||55||24||31||7
|- 
|align=left| 
|3||2||0||1||89||28||61||7
|- 
|align=left| 
|3||1||0||2||17||84||−67||5
|- 
|align=left| 
|3||1||0||2||42||67||−25||5
|}

Pool B
{| class="wikitable" style="text-align: center;"
|-
!width="200"|Team
!width="40"|Pld
!width="40"|W
!width="40"|D
!width="40"|L
!width="40"|PF
!width="40"|PA
!width="40"|+/-
!width="40"|Pts
|- 
|align=left| 
|3||2||1||0||97||36||61||8
|- 
|align=left| 
|3||2||0||1||41||72||−31||7
|- 
|align=left| 
|3||1||1||1||53||56||−3||6
|- 
|align=left| 
|3||0||0||3||39||66||−27||3
|}

Pool C
{| class="wikitable" style="text-align: center;"
|-
!width="200"|Team
!width="40"|Pld
!width="40"|W
!width="40"|D
!width="40"|L
!width="40"|PF
!width="40"|PA
!width="40"|+/-
!width="40"|Pts
|- 
|align=left| 
|3||2||1||0||83||33||50||8
|- 
|align=left| 
|3||2||1||0||78||54||24||8
|-
|align=left| 
|3||1||0||2||45||76||−31||5
|-  
|align=left| 
|3||0||0||3||31||74||−43||3
|}

Pool D
{| class="wikitable" style="text-align: center;"
|-
!width="200"|Team
!width="40"|Pld
!width="40"|W
!width="40"|D
!width="40"|L
!width="40"|PF
!width="40"|PA
!width="40"|+/-
!width="40"|Pts
|- 
|align=left| 
|3||3||0||0||128||22||106||9
|- 
|align=left| 
|3||2||0||1||70||53||17||7
|- 
|align=left| 
|3||1||0||2||51||86||−35||5
|- 
|align=left| 
|3||0||0||3||12||100||−88||3
|}

Knockout

Shield

Bowl

Plate

Cup

External links
London Sevens Fixtures and Results
London Sevens
London Sevens at irb.com

2009–10 IRB Sevens World Series
2009–10 in English rugby union
2010
London Sevens
London Sevens